Robson Ponte (born 6 November 1976) is a Brazilian former footballer who played as an attacking midfielder. He spent most of his career at Bayer 04 Leverkusen in Germany and Urawa Red Diamonds in Japan.

Club career
Ponte was born in São Paulo.

After impressing in a friendly match between his club Guarani and Bayer 04 Leverkusen in early 1999, he was offered a contract by Bundesliga club in August 1999. He played for three seasons at Leverkusen. In the month of his transfer, German techno label Kompakt released a single entitled 'Robson Ponte'.

Before the 2001–02 season started, Ponte moved on loan to another Bundesliga side VfL Wolfsburg. At Wolfsburg, he managed 61 appearances in two seasons and scored 13 goals.

Ponte signed on free transfer with Japanese giants Urawa Red Diamonds before his contract with Leverkusen expired in July 2005. He, an all-around midfielder, took both penalty kicks and corners for Urawa for five seasons. In 2007, he received the Most Valuable Player award of the season.

Ponte ended his playing career with foreign professional leagues in 2010 and returned his country Brazil to spend his last years. He joined Grêmio Barueri on 26 May 2011.

Career statistics

Awards and honours

Club
Urawa Red Diamonds
 AFC Champions League: 2007
 J1 League: 2006
 Emperor's Cup: 2005, 2006
 Japanese Super Cup: 2006

Individual
 J. League Most Valuable Player: 2007
 J. League Best Eleven: 2007

References

External links
 
 
 Leverkusen who's who

Living people
1976 births
Footballers from São Paulo
Brazilian footballers
Brazilian people of Italian descent
Association football midfielders
Bayer 04 Leverkusen players
VfL Wolfsburg players
Urawa Red Diamonds players
Bundesliga players
Guarani FC players
Clube Atlético Juventus players
J1 League Player of the Year winners
J1 League players
Campeonato Brasileiro Série A players
Brazilian expatriate footballers
Brazilian expatriate sportspeople in Japan
Expatriate footballers in Japan
Brazilian expatriate sportspeople in Germany
Expatriate footballers in Germany